The 1973 Torneo Godó – Doubles was an event of the 1973 Torneo Godó tennis tournament and was played on outdoor clay courts at the Real Club de Tenis Barcelona in Barcelona, Spain between 8 October and 14 October 1973. Juan Gisbert and Manuel Orantes were the defending Torneo Godó doubles champions but did not compete together in this edition. Second-seeded Ilie Năstase and Tom Okker won the title by defeating fourth-seeded Antonio Muñoz and Manuel Orantes in the final, 4–6, 6–3, 6–2.

Seeds

Draw

Finals

Top half

Bottom half

References

External links
 ITF tournament edition details

1973 Grand Prix (tennis)